Elections to Hart District Council took place on 6 May 2021 as part of the 2021 United Kingdom local elections. This took place at the same time as the elections for Hampshire County Council and the Hampshire Police and Crime Commissioner.

Background 

The previous election saw the Conservatives lose five seats, two each to Community Campaign Hart and the Liberal Democrats, and one to an Independent Candidate. The council remained under no overall control, with the Conservative Party and Community Campaign the joint largest parties with eleven seats each overall. Subsequently, an administration was formed by Community Campaign Hart and the Liberal Democrats, with Liberal Democrat Councillor David Neighbour becoming leader of the council, and Community Campaign Hart Councillor James Radley becoming deputy leader of the council.

Results summary

Candidates

Blackwater & Hawley

Crookham East

Crookham West & Ewshot

Fleet Central

Fleet East

Fleet West

Hartley Wintney

Hook

Odiham

Yateley East

Yateley West

References 

Hart
2021
2020s in Hampshire